Qalaji (also Romanized as Qalājī; also known as Qalājeh, Qalājeh-ye Soflá, and Qal‘ehjeh) is a village in Kalashi Rural District, Kalashi District, Javanrud County, Kermanshah Province, Iran. At the 2006 census, its population was 529, in 110 families.

References 

Populated places in Javanrud County